Polis, plural poleis, means ‘city’ in Greek. In Ancient Greece, it originally referred to an administrative and religious city center as distinct from the rest of the city. Later it also came to mean the body of citizens under a city's jurisdiction. In modern historiography the term is normally used to refer to the ancient Greek city-states, such as Classical Athens and its contemporaries, and thus is often translated as ‘city-state’.  The poleis were not like other primordial ancient city-states such as Tyre or Sidon, which were ruled by a king or a small oligarchy; rather, they were political entities ruled by their bodies of citizens.

The Ancient Greek poleis developed during the Archaic period as the ancestors of the Ancient Greek city, state and citizenship and persisted (though with decreasing influence) well into Roman times, when the equivalent Latin word was civitas, also meaning ‘citizenhood’, whilst municipium in Latin meant a non-sovereign town or city. The term changed with the development of the governance centre in the city to mean ‘state: (which included the villages surrounding the city). Finally, with the emergence of a notion of citizenship among landowners, it came to describe the entire body of citizens under the city's jurisdiction. The body of citizens came to be the most important meaning of the term polis in ancient Greece.

The Ancient Greek term that specifically meant the totality of urban buildings and spaces is asty. The Ancient Greek poleis consisted of an asty built on an acropolis or harbour and controlling surrounding territories of land ( khôra). The traditional view of archaeologists that the appearance of urbanisation at excavation sites could be read as a sufficient index for the development of a polis was criticised by French historian François Polignac in 1984 and has not been taken for granted in recent decades: the polis of Sparta, for example, was established in a network of villages. The Ancient Greeks did not always refer to Athens, Sparta, Thebes and other poleis as such; they often spoke instead of the Athenians, Lacedaemonians, Thebans and so on.

Polis in Ancient Greek philosophy 
Plato analyzes the polis in the Republic, the Greek title of which, Πολιτεία (Politeia), itself derives from the word polis. The best form of government of the polis for Plato is the one that leads to the common good. The philosopher king is the best ruler because, as a philosopher, he is acquainted with the Form of the Good. In Plato's analogy of the ship of state, the philosopher king steers the polis, as if it were a ship, in the best direction.

Books II–IV of The Republic are concerned with Plato addressing the makeup of an ideal polis. In The Republic, Socrates is concerned with the two underlying principles of any society: mutual needs and differences in aptitude. Starting from these two principles, Socrates deals with the economic structure of an ideal polis. According to Plato there are five main economic classes of any polis: producers, merchants, sailors/shipowners, retail traders and wage earners. Along with the two principles and five economic classes, there are four virtues. The four virtues of a "just city" are wisdom, courage, moderation and justice. With all of these principles, classes and virtues, it was believed that a "just city" (polis) would exist.

Archaic and classical poleis
The basic and indicating elements of a polis are:
 Self-governance, autonomy, and independence (city-state)
 Agora: the social hub and financial marketplace, on and around a large centrally located open space
 Acropolis: the citadel, inside which a temple had replaced the erstwhile Mycenaean anáktoron (palace) or mégaron (hall)
 Greek urban planning and architecture, public, religious, and private (see Hippodamian plan)
 Temples, altars, and sacred precincts: one or more are dedicated to the poliouchos, the patron deity of the city; each polis kept its own particular festivals and customs (Political religion, as opposed to the individualized religion of later antiquity). Priests and priestesses, although often drawn from certain families by tradition, did not form a separate collegiality or class; they were ordinary citizens who on certain occasions were called to perform certain functions.
 Gymnasia
 Theatres
 Walls: used for protection from invaders
 Coins: minted by the city, and bearing its symbols
 Colonies being founded by the oikistes of the metropolis
 Political life: it revolved around the sovereign Ekklesia (the assembly of all adult male citizens for deliberation and voting), the standing boule and other civic or judicial councils, the archons and other officials or magistrates elected either by vote or by lot, clubs, etc., and sometimes punctuated by stasis (civil strife between parties, factions or socioeconomic classes, e.g., aristocrats, oligarchs, democrats, tyrants, the wealthy, the poor, large, or small landowners, etc.).  They practised direct democracy.
 Publication of state functions: laws, decrees, and major fiscal accounts were published, and criminal and civil trials were also held in public.
 Synoecism, conurbation: Absorption of nearby villages and countryside, and the incorporation of their tribes into the substructure of the polis. Many of a polis' citizens lived in the suburbs or countryside. The Greeks regarded the polis less as a territorial grouping than as a religious and political association: while the polis would control territory and colonies beyond the city itself, the polis would not simply consist of a geographical area. Most cities were composed of several tribes or phylai, which were in turn composed of phratries (common-ancestry lineages), and finally génea (extended families).
 Social classes and citizenship: Dwellers of the polis were generally divided into four types of inhabitants, with status typically determined by birth:
 Citizens with full legal and political rights: that is, free adult men born legitimately of citizen parents. They had the right to vote, be elected into office, and bear arms, and the obligation to serve when at war.
 Ephebos
 Citizens without formal political rights but with full legal rights: the citizens' female relatives and underage children, whose political rights and interests were meant to be represented by their adult male relatives.
 Citizens of other poleis who chose to reside elsewhere (the metics, μέτοικοι, métoikoi, literally "transdwellers"): though free-born and possessing full rights in their place of origin, they had full legal rights but no political rights in their place of residence. Metics could not vote or be elected to office. A liberated slave was likewise given a metic's status if he chose to remain in the polis, at least that was the case in Athens. They otherwise had full personal and property rights, albeit subject to taxation.
 Slaves: chattel in full possession of their owner, and with no privileges other than those that their owner would grant (or revoke) at will.

Polis during Hellenistic and Roman times
During the Hellenistic period, which marks the decline of the classical polis, the following cities remained independent: Sparta until 195 BC after the War against Nabis. Achaean League is the last example of original Greek city-state federations (dissolved after the Battle of Corinth (146 BC)). The Cretan city-states continued to be independent (except Itanus and Arsinoe, which lay under Ptolemaic influence) until the conquest of Crete in 69 BC by Rome. The cities of Magna Graecia, with the notable examples of Syracuse and Tarentum, were conquered by Rome in the late 3rd century BC. There are also some cities with recurring independence like Samos, Priene, Miletus, and Athens. A remarkable example of a city-state that flourished during this era is Rhodes, through its merchant navy, until 43 BC and the Roman conquest.

The Hellenistic colonies and cities of the era retain some basic characteristics of a polis, except the status of independence (city-state) and the political life. There is self-governance (like the new Macedonian title politarch), but under a ruler and king. The political life of the classical era was transformed into an individualized religious and philosophical view of life (see Hellenistic philosophy and religion). Demographic decline forced the cities to abolish the status of metic and bestow citizenship; in 228 BC, Miletus enfranchised over 1,000 Cretans. Dyme sold its citizenship for one talent, payable in two installments. The foreign residents in a city are now called paroikoi. In an age when most political establishments in Asia are kingdoms, the Chrysaorian League in Caria was a Hellenistic federation of poleis.

During the Roman era, some cities were granted the status of a polis, or free city, self-governed under the Roman Empire. The last institution commemorating the old Greek poleis was the Panhellenion, established by Hadrian.

Derived words and names

Common nouns
Derivatives of polis are common in many modern European languages. This is indicative of the influence of the polis-centred Hellenic world view. Derivative words in English include policy, polity, police, and politics. In Greek, words deriving from polis include politēs and politismos, whose exact equivalents in Latin, Romance, and other European languages, respectively civis ("citizen"), civilisatio ("civilisation"), etc., are similarly derived.

A number of other common nouns end in -polis. Most refer to a special kind of city or state. Examples include:
 Acropolis ("high city"), Athens, Greece – although not a city-polis by itself, but a fortified citadel that consisted of functional buildings and the Temple in honor of the city-sponsoring god or goddess. The Athenian acropolis was the most famous of all acropoleis in the ancient Greek World and its main temple was the Parthenon, in honor of Athena Parthenos (Athena the Virgin). More generally, Acropolis has been used to describe the upper part of a polis, often a citadel or the site of major temples
 Astropolis – a star-scaled city/industry area; a complex space station; a European star-related festival
 Cosmopolis – a large urban centre with a population of many different cultural backgrounds; a novel written by Don DeLillo
 Ecumenopolis – a city that covers an entire planet, usually seen in science fiction
 Megalopolis – created by the merging of several cities and their suburbs
 Metropolis – the mother city of a colony; the see of a metropolitan archbishop; a metropolitan area (major urban population centre)
 Necropolis ("city of the dead") – a graveyard
 Technopolis – a city with high-tech industry; a room of computers; the Internet

City names with numbers
Others refer to part of a city or a group of cities, such as:

1. Polis, or Polis Chrysochous, located on the northwest coast of Cyprus within the Paphos District and on the edge of the Akamas peninsula. During the Cypro-Classical period, Polis became one of the most important ancient Cypriot city-kingdoms on the island, with important commercial relations with the eastern Aegean Islands, Attica, and Corinth. The town is also well known due to its mythological history, including the site of the Baths of Aphrodite.

3. Tripolis – a group of three cities, retained in the names of Tripoli, Libya, Tripoli, Greece and Tripoli, Lebanon

4. Tetrapolis - a group of four cities

5. Pentapolis – a group of five cities

6. Hexapolis - a group of six cities

7. Heptapolis, Middle Egypt - a group of seven cities

8. Octapolis, in ancient Caria or Lycia - a group of eight cities

10. Decapolis, a group of ten cities in the Levant

12. Dodecapolis – a group of twelve cities

Descriptive names
The names of several other towns and cities in Europe and the Middle East have contained the suffix -polis since antiquity or currently feature modernized spellings, such as -pol. Notable examples include:

 Adrianopolis or Adrianople ("Hadrian's city"), present-day Edirne, Turkey
 Alexandropol ("Alexandra's city"), currently Gyumri, Armenia
 Alexandroupolis ("Alexander's city"), Greece
 Antipolis ("the city across"), the former name for Antibes, France
 Constantinopolis or Constantinople ("Constantine's city"), the former name for Istanbul, Turkey.
 Gallipoli (‘beautiful city’)
 Heliopolis (‘Sun city’) in ancient and modern Egypt, Lebanon, and Greece
 Heracleopolis ("Hercules' city"), Egypt
 Hermopolis ("Hermes' city"), several cities in Egypt and on Siros Island
 Hierakonpolis ("Hawk city"), Egypt
 Hieropolis ("Sacred city"), several cities in the Hellenistic world, in particular Hierapolis in southwestern Turkey
 Istanbul (derived from the Greek phrase "εἰς τὴν Πόλιν" meaning "to the city"), Turkey.
 Istropolis, currently Bratislava, Slovakia.
 Lithopolis ("Stone city"), Latin name for Kamnik, Slovenia
 Mariupol ("Marios' City"), Ukraine (Greek: Μαριούπολης, Marioupolis)
 Megalopolis ("Great city"), Greece
 Neapolis ("New city"), several, including the modern cities of Nablus and Naples, and the adjective Neapolitan
 Nicopolis ("Victory city"), Emmaus in Israel
 Persepolis ("city of the Persians"), Iran
 Philippopolis ("Philip's city"), the former name for Plovdiv, Bulgaria.
 Seuthopolis ("Seuthes' city"), Bulgaria
 Sevastopol ("Venerable city"), Crimea, Ukraine
 Simferopol ("city of common good"), Crimea, Ukraine
 Sozopol ("Salvaged city"), Bulgaria
 Stavropol ("city of the cross"), Russia
 Tiraspol ("Tiras' city"), Moldova

Modern cities
The names of other cities were also given the suffix -polis after antiquity, either referring to ancient names or unrelated:
 Anápolis, Goiás, Brazil
 Annapolis, Maryland, United States
 Augustinópolis, Tocantins, Brazil
 Biopolis, Singapore
 Borrazópolis, Parana, Brazil
 Cambysopolis, Turkey
 Cassopolis, Michigan, United States
 Christianopel, Sweden
 Copperopolis, California, United States
 Coraopolis, Pennsylvania, United States
 Demopolis, Alabama, United States
 Dianópolis, Tocantins, Brazil
 Divinópolis, Minas Gerais, Brazil
 Eunápolis, Bahia, Brazil
 Florianópolis ("Floriano's city"), Santa Catarina, Brazil
 Gallipolis, Ohio, United States
 Indianapolis, Indiana, United States
 Kannapolis, North Carolina, United States
 Lithopolis, Ohio, United States
 Marijampolė,  Lithuania
 Metropolis,  Illinois, United States
 Minneapolis, Minnesota, United States
 Opolis, Kansas, United States
 Penápolis, São Paulo, Brazil
 Petrópolis ("Pedro's city"), Rio de Janeiro, Brazil
 Piopolis, Quebec, Canada
 Pirenópolis, Goiás, Brazil
 Quirinópolis, Goiás, Brazil
 Rondonópolis, Mato Grosso, Brazil
 Rorainópolis, Roraima, Brazil
 Salinópolis, Pará, Brazil
 Sebastopol, California, United States
 Sophia-Antipolis, France
 Teresópolis ("Teresa's city"), Rio de Janeiro, Brazil
 Teutopolis, Illinois, United States
 Thermopolis, Wyoming, United States
 Uniopolis, Ohio, United States

See also
 Synoecism
 The Other Greeks
List of ancient Greek cities

Notes

References

Further reading
 Ando, Clifford. 1999. "Was Rome a Polis?". Classical Antiquity 18.1: 5–34.
 Brock, R., and S. Hodkinson, eds. 2000. Alternatives to Athens: Varieties of Political Organisation and Community in Ancient Greece. Oxford: Oxford University Press.
 Davies, J. K. 1977–1978. "Athenian Citizenship: The Descent Group and the Alternatives." Classical Journal 73.2: 105–121.
 Hall, J. M. 2007. "Polis, Community and Ethnic Identity." In The Cambridge Companion to Archaic Greece. Edited by H. A. Shapiro, 40–60. Cambridge: Cambridge University Press.
 Hansen, M. H., and T. H. Nielsen, eds. 2004. An Inventory of Archaic and Classical Poleis. Oxford: Oxford University Press.
 Hansen, M. H. 2006. Polis: An Introduction to the Ancient Greek City-State. Oxford: Oxford University Press.
 Hansen, M. H., ed. 1993. The Ancient Greek City-State: Symposium on the Occasion of the 250th Anniversary of the Royal Danish Academy of Sciences and Letters, July 1–4, 1992. Copenhagen: Royal Danish Academy.
 Hansen, M. H. 1999. The Athenian Democracy in the age of Demosthenes: Structure, Principles and Ideology. 2nd ed. London: Bristol Classical Press.
 Hansen, M. H., ed. 1997. The Polis as an Urban Centre and Political Community. Copenhagen: Royal Danish Academy.
 Jones, N. F. 1987. Public Organization in Ancient Greece: A Documentary Study. Philadelphia: American Philosophical Society.
 Kraay, C. M. 1976. Archaic and Classical Greek Coins. Berkeley: University of California Press.
 Millar, F. G. B. 1993. "The Greek City in the Roman Period". In The Ancient Greek City-State: Symposium on the Occasion of the 250th Anniversary of the Royal Danish Academy of Sciences and Letters, July 1–4, 1992. Edited by M. H. Hansen, 232–260. Copenhagen: Royal Danish Academy.
 Osborne, R. 2009. Greece in the Making. 2nd ed. London: Routledge.
 Polignac, F. de. 1995. Cults, Territory, and the Origins of the Greek City-State. Translated by J. Lloyd. Chicago: University of Chicago Press.
 van der Vliet, E. 2012. "The Durability and Decline of Democracy in Hellenistic Poleis". Mnemosyne 65.4–5: 771–786.

External links

 
 The Copenhagen Polis Center

City-states